Colobothea dispersa is a species of beetle in the family Cerambycidae. It was described by Bates in 1872. It is known from Honduras and Colombia.

References

dispersa
Beetles described in 1872